Cherubs! Paradise Lost is a graphic novel by Bryan Talbot who wrote the script and provided the layouts, with the finished art by Mark Stafford. The first book, or 'cantica' was published by Desperado Publishing in November 2007 and the first and second books were combined, completing the story, in a hardcover edition published by Dark Horse in 2015.

Talbot describes it as "an irreverent fast-paced supernatural comedy-adventure."

Plot
In Cantica I: Paradise lost: On the trail of the murdering archangel Abaddon, the Cherubs get stuck in the mind-numbing mediocrity of Limbo - but not for long. They escape and make it to New York City where, looking for signs and portents, they foil a mugging and are befriended by Mary, a sexy 'exotic dancer'. But she has a problem: her boss is Frankie Dracula and his vampire minions are out to kill her!

In Cantica II: Hell On Earth Mary and the Cherubs are drawn into a battle with the massed forces of the Hell whilst attempting to foil Abbadon's plans to instigate the apocalypse.

Notes

External links
 Cherubs! Paradise Lost on the Desperado Publishing site
 Cherubs at the Official Bryan Talbot fansite

Interviews
 Interview with Bryan Talbot and Mark Stafford, 2008, about Cherubs! on Resonance FM

2007 graphic novels
2007 comics debuts
American graphic novels
Comics by Bryan Talbot
Fantasy comics
Limbo
Angels in popular culture
Comics set in New York City